Bunje is an unincorporated community in Bond County, Illinois, United States. Bunje is one mile west of Sorento.

References

Unincorporated communities in Bond County, Illinois
Unincorporated communities in Illinois